Ernie Mills is a third generation Decoy maker, who was born in 1934 near Bangor, Pennsylvania.  He makes Lower Chesapeake style decoys.  Nationally recognized as a folk artist, his traditional working decoys can be found in private collections and museums, including the Smithsonian Institution.

Career
In 1980, Ernie Mills was commissioned by Ducks Unlimited to make decoys for their fund raising events and auctions.  His reputation as a decoy maker grew, and he was awarded with a Ducks Unlimited Life Sponsor award in 1985.

Ernie Mills makes traditional working decoys, using techniques that he had been taught by his father and grandfather.  He is recognized as one of the few extant decoy makers that still use a hatchet.

The May/June 2010 issue of Decoy Magazine has a feature story that states "Ernie Mills is one of the most collectible working decoy makers on the East Coast".

Awards

1993: A selection of Ernie Mills's decoys and tools are placed on permanent exhibit at the Atlanta History Center's "Shaping Traditions: Folk Arts in a Changing South".

1996: One of twelve traditional folk artists selected by the Smithsonian Institution to demonstrate decoy making at the 1996 Atlanta Olympic Games.  Two of Ernie Mills's decoys are now in the Smithsonian Institution.

2010: Nominated for 2011 National Endowment for the Arts "National Heritage Fellowship", which is the Nation's Highest Honor in the Folk and Traditional Arts.

References

External links 
 Digital Library of Georgia - Ernie Mills: Decoy Maker
 Ernie Mills: New Georgia Encyclopedia Video
 The Canvasback magazine, Havre de Grace Decoy Museum, Maryland, Summer 1998, cover story about Ernie Mills and pp 9-16. Digital pdf document.
 Decoy Magazine: List of Decoy Makers
 The Individual and Tradition: Folkloristic Perspectives - Edited by Ray Cashman, Tom Mould, Pravina Shukla

1934 births
Folk artists
Living people